The gyrfalcon is the largest of the falcon species.

Gyrfalcon may also refer to:
 Gyrfalcon Islands, an uninhabited island group in the Qikiqtaaluk Region of Nunavut, Canada
 Gerfalcon (novel), a fantasy novel by Leslie Barringer
 Shenyang FC-31 "Gyrfalcon", a Chinese prototype fighter airplane